The 2013 Lebanese football match-fixing scandal was part of a worldwide FIFA investigation with the intent of cracking down on match fixing. Many players were found guilty of being bribed by betting companies to purposefully lose games, with matches not only limited to domestic leagues in Asia, but also international competitions. 24 players were fined in various degrees, with Ramez Dayoub and Mahmoud El Ali being given the most severe punishment: a lifetime ban from the sport and a $15,000 fine.

Overview
FIFA held an investigation to crack down on match fixing across the world. Their investigation was concentrated mostly on European football, but it also looked at the problem in Africa, South America and in Asia. In 2012, over 50 countries were under investigation for match fixing—about one quarter of the entire 209 members overseen by FIFA's governing body. The suspicion of a scandal within Lebanese football began in late 2012, when many Lebanese players were accused of purposefully losing games in the Lebanese league and other leagues across Asia. The scandal was not limited only to matches in football leagues across Asia, but included international matches. Players were bribed by large betting companies to throw games or to put the opposing team in favorable position to win the match.

Once the scandal broke, the Lebanese Football Association (LFA) began to investigate allegations that had been made against Lebanese football players. The LFA appointed the general secretary of the West Asian Football Federation (WAFF), Fadi Zreiqat, to lead the investigation. During the two-month-long investigation, involving more than 60 witnesses, Zreiqat concluded there was proof that match fixing was actually occurring.

Findings and consequences

The Lebanese match-fixing scandal was revealed in a report that led to the suspension of 24 Lebanese players in domestic clubs in Lebanon, Asian clubs, and even the Lebanese national team. In addition to the 24 players, two officials were also involved in match-fixing in Lebanon. Soon after Zreiqat's findings were released, the Lebanese Football Association (LFA) handed out fines and also suspended the individuals involved from playing the sport. 20 Lebanese football players were suspended from playing for one year and given a $2,000 fine, while two players were suspended for three years and given a $7,000 fine each. These 22 players belonged either to the domestic league in Lebanon or other leagues across Asia.

The most severe punishments were given to Ramez Dayoub and Mahmoud El Ali. They were each given a $15,000 fine and banned from playing the sport for life. Dayoub and El Ali both played for Lebanon's national football team and also club teams in Asia. The reason their punishments were more severe than those of the other players was because the match fixing took place on the international level while they were playing for the national team. The pair have been associated with attempting and succeeding at manipulating matches on different occasions. These include 2012 Arab Nations Cup matches in Saudi Arabia, and rumors of a match against Qatar in the 2014 World Cup qualifiers.

Lebanon advanced for the first time in its history to the fourth and final round of the World Cup qualifiers. Because of the match-fixing scandal, which led to a crucial loss, however, their hopes of qualifying for the 2014 tournament decreased significantly. Theo Bücker, the German coach who took control of Lebanon's national team in 2011, and took the team from being unsuccessful and transformed it to qualify for the final round of the World Cup Qualification, was extremely disappointed and frustrated. The team's success included defeating Asian football giants Iran and South Korea. In 2012, Lebanon lost to Qatar in the World Cup Qualifiers 1–0. Dayoub made an extremely bad pass that was intercepted by the Qatar striker Sebastian Soria who gave his team their only goal to defeat Lebanon. After the investigation was complete, Bücker had the following to say: "We were showing some action and then suddenly a (Qatar) player has the ball in a one-on-one situation and you get the feeling that something is wrong. The guy looked paralyzed or something." His frustration with Dayoub continued as he said: "I never came close to the idea that someone could not just sell the game, but sell their country".

Soon after the LFA handed out these penalties to the players involved in the match-fixing scandal, FIFA sent a letter praising the Association's response to the report.

Details

In February 2013, Ramez Dayoub found himself at the center of a controversy given that, despite the ban suffered by the Lebanese Football Association (LFA), his club, Selangor (Malaysia), wanted to field him for the AFC Cup match against Kingfisher East Bengal. At the end of the match, lost by Selangor 1–0, Dayoub, whose name was canceled from the fixture list a few minutes before the start of the game, told Fox Sports: "I am not guilty. They have suspended me and accused me of match fixing without any evidence or proof."

Two other domestic players, Nejmeh's Mohammad Jaafar and Ahed's Hadi Sahmarani, were banned for three seasons and handed $7,000 fines for their involvement. Twenty more players were banned for a year and each given $2,000 fines; ten were Ahed players, most notably Akram Moghrabi, who played for Churchill Brothers in the 2012–13 I-League, Ahmad Zreik, and Hussein Dakik.

The Asian Football Confederation (AFC) received the summary report from the Lebanese Football Association (LFA) of their investigations and subsequent action against involvement of Lebanese players in match fixing. The AFC had also asked the LFA to provide the full report of their investigation. The LFA informed the All India Football Federation (AIFF) and the football federations of Malaysia and Indonesia of the sanctions on Lebanese players plying their trade in these countries.

Player sanctions
The player sanctions were divided into three categories:

Category A
Two players received a lifetime suspension from football and a $15,000 fine:
 Mahmoud El Ali (Persiba Balikpapan)
 Ramez Dayoub (Selangor)

Category B
Two players received a three-season suspension from club football, a lifetime suspension from the national team, and a $7,000 fine:
 Mohamad Jaafar (Nejmeh)
 Hadi Sahmrani (Ahed)

Category C
Twenty players received a one-season suspension from club football, a lifetime suspension from the national team, and a $2,000 fine:
 Mohamad Abou Atik (Ahed)
 Hassan Alawiyeh (Nejmeh)
 Tarek El Ali (Ahed)
 Nazih Assaad (Nejmeh)
 Ali Bazzi (Ahed)
 Hussein Dakik (Ahed)
 Ali Faour (Ahed)
 Mohamed Hammoud (Ahed)
 Abbas Kenaan (Ahed)
 Hassan Mezher (Ahed)
 Akram Moghrabi (Churchill Brothers)
 Bashar El Mokdad (Safa)
 Omar Owaida (Safa)
 Issa Ramadan (Chabab Ghazieh)
 Ali Al Saadi (Safa)
 Hussein Sharifeh (Nejmeh)
 Ahmad Younes (Khoyol)
 Mohamed Baker Younes (Ahed)
 Samer Zeineddine (Nejmeh)
 Ahmad Zreik (Ahed)

See also
List of sporting scandals

Notes

References

Lebanon, 2013
Association football controversies
Match fixing
Match fixing